Prasophyllum wallum, commonly known as the wallum leek orchid, is a species of orchid endemic to a small area in Queensland. It has a single tubular leaf and up to eighteen scented, greenish flowers with a white labellum. It is a distinctive species of leek orchid with its green and white, crowded flowers.

Description
As with others in the genus, the flowers are inverted so that the labellum is above the column rather than below it. Flowering occurs in August or September.

Taxonomy and naming
Prasophyllum wallum was first formally described in 1991 by Robert Bates and David Jones from a specimen collected near Coolum and the description was published in Australian Orchid Research. The specific epithet (wallum) refers to the wallum community where this species occurs.

Distribution and habitat
The wallum leek orchid grows in wallum and nearby stabilised sand dunes between Hervey Bay and Coolum.

Conservation
Prasophyllum wallum is listed as "Vulnerable" under the Commonwealth Government Environment Protection and Biodiversity Conservation Act 1999 (EPBC) Act and the Queensland Nature Conservation (Wildlife) Regulation 2006. The main threat to the species are habitat loss, inappropriate fire regimes and illegal collecting.

References

External links 
 

wallum
Flora of Queensland
Endemic orchids of Australia
Plants described in 1991